KaMaxaquene (a.k.a. KaMaxakeni) is a bairro in Maputo, Mozambique.

References 

Populated places in Mozambique